Bhowal/Bhawal is an Indian family name of the Bengali Brahmin and Kayasthas. They're found in Assam, North Western to Central Bangladesh and West Bengal. Although the majority of the population migrated to India during the Partition of India in 1947, followed by East Pakistan Genocides of 1950, 1954–1956, 1965, a minority of the population still resides in Bangladesh.

Geographical Distribution
As of 2014, 2,879 known bearers of this surname were from India out of 3,010 people (approximately) in the World.
Others include Bangladesh, United Arab Emirates, the United States, etc. where a good number of these people reside.

Further reading
 Bhawal National Park
 Gazipur
 1950 East Pakistan riots 
 Bhawal Badre Alam Govt. College

References

Indian surnames